Commercial Radio Hong Kong (CRHK, aka Hong Kong Commercial Broadcasting Company Limited is one of the two commercial radio broadcasting companies in Hong Kong along with Metro Radio Hong Kong. CRHK provides a line-up of entertainment, including informative, educational, artistical and cultural programmes; CRHK also provides updates on current affairs as well as news and weather reports.

The station hosts the 903 Top 20, a record chart based on airtime.

History
CRHK was founded by George Ho Ho-Chi on 26 August 1959, when he inherited HK$50,000 from his father Sir Robert Ho Tung. The 10-year franchise of Radio Rediffusion ended its radio operation in 1959. CRHK joined Radio Rediffusion and Radio Television Hong Kong to make what was called the "Three kingdoms of local radio stations". It was one of the most flourishing times in Hong Kong radio broadcasting history, since more competition yielded better productions. However, Radio Rediffusion closed down at the end of September 1973.

At the very beginning, Commercial Radio was situated in Lai Chi Kok, near what is today's Mei Foo Sun Chuen. It only obtained the present site at 3, Broadcast Drive in Kowloon Tong on 25 July 1966, nine years after it had started broadcasting in Hong Kong. While the new five-floor building was under refurbishment, the station was temporarily housed in Yau Yat Chuen, until the brand new complex came into use on 26 August 1971.

Although CRHK has its own news broadcasts nowadays and provides the latest news on major events around the world, the news division of CRHK was only formed in 1974. At first, news broadcasts were provided by the Information Services Department of the Hong Kong government and later from RTHK. The establishment of its own news division marked a new era in the company's history, since it finally became an independent organisation.

G.J. Ho, son of George Ho, is now the chairman of CRHK. The licence of CRHK was renewed on 22 July 2003 and will last for another 12 years until 26 August 2016.  The statutory body Hong Kong Broadcasting Authority continue to regulate Hong Kong broadcasters.

Channels
Currently CRHK broadcasts through two Cantonese Channels on the FM band and an English one on the AM band. All of the channels are 24-hour broadcast and each of them has its distinct programme formats and audience.

FM 88.1
CR1 FM 88.1 has the widest audience base in Hong Kong. It is a talk-based channel which broadcasts current affairs, traffic and financial information. There are also many talk shows and interactive phone-in shows. It also offers some cultural dramas programmes. Its target audience are 25- to 40-year-old professionals.

FM 90.3
CR2 FM 90.3 is a music-based channel targeted at the younger generation and audience who are interested in pop music. The programmes feature the latest news in pop music, including Cantonese, Japanese and English songs. This channel is also known for organising one of the four Hong Kong annual music awards, in which the prizes are awarded to the singers according to how often their songs are plugged, as they call it in Hong Kong, by the DJs.

AM 864
AM 864 is an English channel. It used to offer a diversity of music, from the latest international hits to hip-hop, R&B, jazz, rock and roll, grunge music. It was intended to cater toward audiences all around the world.

Audiences could keep up with the latest news, especially with global issues, through CRHK. News were broadcast every hour throughout the day, with weather forecast and traffic reports. In addition, it regularly produced news reports and public affairs programmes.

From 2000–2003, AM864 was partnered with HMV and was called HMV 864.
Amongst other name, Quote 864 was also used as an on-air name.

In 2004 the station became all music, i.e. without presenters, and only breaking for the hourly news. The format is hit music from the 1960s, 1970s, 1980s, 1990s, 2000s and 2010s. It caters to music lovers from every generation.

Notable programmes

FM 88.1
Among all 88.1 Programmes, there are three programmes that actively discuss contemporary Hong Kong political, social and economic issues every day.

"On a Clear Day" airs during the weekdays, from Monday to Friday, from 6am to 10am. This four-hour programme is hosted by Stephen Chan, Chan Chung and Ken Kwok. The hosts make the programme more interactive by inviting some of the audience and sometimes guests to participate in the discussion of current issues. The programme has a session called voice column in which some Commercial Radio DJs participate as columnists, sharing their own viewpoints on certain issues, e.g. the column "" by To Kit, who has worked for the British Broadcasting Corporation for 8 years.

"Circles" airs during Monday to Friday 3:00pm to 5:00pm. This programme is focusing with the interview with the celebrities and special guests.

"Summit" airs during Monday to Friday 11:00pm to 12:00am. This programme is hosted by Chip Tsao and special hosts. It is a talk programme focusing on the current affairs in Hong Kong, international relations, and culture related stuffs.

FM 90.3
Among all 90.3 Programmes, there are two programmes that actively discuss contemporary Hong Kong political, social and economic issues every day, in a more relaxed way to telling that.

"On a Clear Day" airs during the weekdays, from Monday to Friday, from 8am to 10am. This two-hour programme is hosted by Jan Lamb, Ken Yuen and Michelle Lo. The hosts make the programme more interactive by inviting some of the audience and sometimes guests to participate in the discussion of current issues, in a more comedy way. The programme has a session called voice column in which some Commercial Radio DJs participate as columnists, sharing their own viewpoints on certain issues, e.g. the column "" by To Kit, who has worked for the British Broadcasting Corporation for 8 years.

"Good Morning King" airs during the weekdays, from Monday to Friday, from 10am to 12pm. This programme is hosted by Sammy Leung, Kitty Yuen and Marco Hung.

AM 864
Two foreign-language radio programmes – "Hong Kong-Pak This Evening" in Urdu and "Nepal Darshan" in Nepali – were launched jointly by Commercial Radio and the Home Affairs Bureau from 18 June 2005, to promote multi-culturalism in Hong Kong. It aims at strengthening the sense of belonging of the ethnic minorities in Hong Kong, but at the same time retaining their cultural identities and differences. 

The programmes broadcast for 26 consecutive Saturdays on Commercial Radio Channel 1 (AM864) until 10 December 2005. "Hong Kong-Pak This Evening" and "Nepal Darshan" were on air from 08:00pm to 08:30pm and from 08:30pm to 09:00pm respectively. The Urdu programme was hosted by Abid Ali Baig, who is a poet and writer, who had been working in the broadcasting industry for 30 years in Pakistan; whereas the Nepali one was hosted by Pushpa Kumar Rai, who had worked in the former British Forces Broadcasting Service for almost 20 years and he is familiar to many Nepalese ears in Hong Kong. The programmes comprise mainly music, news, sport, current affairs and community services related to the respective ethnic groups; local celebrities from the ethnic groups were also invited to talk about their own cultures and their assimilation into the community.

Another programme on AM864 is for the Filipino community in Hong Kong, Good Evening Kabayan. Its initial broadcast aired on the 9th of July in 2001. It started as a two-hour show and two years later aired twice a week on the channel.

In late 2017, the two programmes have been renamed to classify two different formats. From 9pm to 11pm every Friday airs "Pinoy Hit Music Central" and every Saturday, on the same time slot, airs "Pilipinas Week In Review" (P.W.I.R.)

Hit Music Central plays the latest and most unforgettable Original Pinoy Music. It features interviews with celebrities from the Philippines and airs the most requested O.P.M's by its listeners.

Pilipinas Week In Review gives its Pinoy listeners in Hong Kong and around the globe, the latest news and current affairs in Hong Kong and the Philippines.

Controversy and criticism

In the middle of 2004, three of the programme hosts were all well known for their out-spoken hosting style over social and political matters.  Suddenly, all three announced they would stop. Albert Cheng Jing Han announced a hiatus from hosting his programme in April 2004, claiming pressure from the Chinese government, and announced his resignation by the end of July. Another famous political programme host Raymond Wong Yuk-man announced his decision to quit his own programme on the 13 May claiming there was threat to his family's safety. However, he decided to rejoin CRHK to host a brand new programme for the station in October 2004. Allen Lee Peng Fei replaced Cheng Jing Han who announced his resignation on the 19 May also for political reasons. Freedom of speech has been a concern in Hong Kong since the 1997 Handover.

In May 2010, the memory of Lam Bun was evoked after CR allowed the pro-Beijing Democratic Alliance for the Betterment of Hong Kong to sponsor a political radio programme. Activists protested outside the station with images of Lam, a CR host who was assassinated during the 1967 riots and who became an icon of free speech, complaining that the station had desecrated his memory. The DAB said the shows were about livelihood issues, and denied they promoted a political stance.

In late 2013, as a prelude to the renewal of its broadcasting licence, CR replaced outspoken critic of CY Leung who hosted an influential prime-time morning talk show. Lee Wai-ling, long despised by the pro-establishment camp for her vocal criticism of the government, was abruptly shunted to a less prominent evening show and replaced by station chief executive Stephen Chan Chi-wan. Chan denied political motivations were involved. But one former media executive said that it was "an open secret" that some outspoken programme hosts disliked by the government have to leave at the time of licence renewal, as media operators are under considerable political pressure.

Commercial Radio Production

Commercial Radio Production Co. Ltd. (CRP) was established in 1997 to produce radio commercials themselves for their partners, but it has also become a brand of its own now. It aims at providing faster and more updated information and an entertainment platform to the public in the future. It also keeps on providing market-promotion service to its customers.

Productions
CRP organises different kinds of concerts and outdoor activities, such as "Ultimate Song Chart Awards Presentation", "903 id club Music is Life Concert", "Famine 30" . Also, CRP holds different forms of gathering for the audience of CRHK, such as "903id club"; these activities thus provide a platform and more chances for both the DJs and the audience to communicate with each other. In addition, CRP has been issuing their company products, including books and stationery, to promote its own brand.

Art room
While producing and organising different kinds of activities, a large number of art products are needed, such as pamphlets, posters and even the stage design of the "Ultimate Song Chart Awards Presentation". It fosters creativity and the production of aesthetic artwork.

The Basement
There has always been keen competition amongst Hong Kong radio stations. Recently, CRP launches video production services and issues "903 Music on the Move". In this programme, music and pictures are combined and it creates a new definition for radio production. This combination is then moved on to mobile phone service, creating another new medium for radio and music and hence for the users.

881903.com
CRHK has launched 881903.com in 1995 as the official website of Commercial Radio Hong Kong. CRP is the administrative organisation of 881903.com. The signal is retransmitted through the internet and anyone can listen to it online. Although only the Cantonese version is available, it acts as a platform for the radio station to promote its programmes and related products. In fact, internet users can find updated news and financial information, programme schedule, programme synopsis and even personal pages of the DJs. By logging onto the page, people from all over the world can listen to Radio 1 and 2. Members of 881903.com can have access to past radio programmes as well. An open forum can also be found on 881903.com which allows the audience to leave comments on the radio programmes or the DJs. Because of its rising popularity, a multimedia marketing platform is formed which enables CRP to target a larger audience, especially from overseas countries. Extra revenue is gained from its advertisers such as Netvigator, ICQ and Motorola.

By having an online radio station, the audience can enjoy greater convenience and more flexibility in listening to the radio and it also helps globalise their programmes, hence the radio station.

my903.com
In 2006, CRHK has launched a dedicated website MY903.com (formerly 90345678.com and 903456.com) for its CR2 channel. This website uses an interactive and eye-catching layout to make closer connection between programme audiences and hosts. Thus creating a promotion platform for special features in prime programmes. In 2007, MY 903 FORUM launched its beta version. This enables instant discussion on programmes between hosts and audiences and an alternative platform for channel opinions.

903 id Club

"903id Club" is an organisation established by Radio 2, CRHK, where "id" stands for "I Dream", "I Discover", "I Dare" and "I Decide". 903id club aims at promoting local music and is a trend setter for local teenagers. For example, it is one of the organisers of is Life Concert>>, which attracts thousands of audience every year. It also promotes new films and introduces the latest trend to the public. Besides, 903id club creates a channel for music and film lovers to share their thoughts and interests. This once again shows CRP's emphasis on audience's involvement.

Moreover, 903id club is linked to several radio programmes, such as "Sammy Moving" and some of the DJs of those programmes work on projects supported by the club. One of the very successful examples is the annual drama performance done by Sammy Leung Chi-Kin and Kitty Yuen Siu-Yee. Another success story is the boy group I love you boyz, formed by popular DJs Jim Yan and Donald. The group is known for their exaggerating and eerie comedic image. High-profile DJ Jan Lamb has also hosted a series of stand-up comedy shows produced by CR Productions.

Also, members of 903id club can have discounts in various shops e.g. Laneige and join activities organised by the club. This reinforces the audience's sense of belonging to the channels.

Board of directors
Honorary chairman: George Ho*
Chairman: George Joseph Ho*
Deputy chairman: Winnie Yu*
Chief Executive Officer: Rita Chan
non executive director: Kwok-kit Leung*
non executive director: Richard Yat-sun Tang*
non executive director: Michael Chi-hung Tse*
non executive director: Chin-kung Kwok*
non executive director: Amy Mei-yan Miao*
 *: board of directors of the H.C.B.C. Enterprises Limited.

See also 
Media of Hong Kong
Metro Broadcast Corporation
RTHK
HKGFM.net (www.hkgfm.net)

References
 Chen, Y.J. (2000). A history of Chinese radio broadcasting in Hong Kong 1928–1997. Hong Kong : University of Hong Kong.
 Lok, H., Yam, T., Ting, T. (2002). Broadcasting services survey 2002 : report. Hong Kong : Broadcasting Authority.
 Radio Television Hong Kong (1999). 70 years of broadcasting in Hong Kong, 1928–1998. Hong Kong : Radio Television Hong Kong.
 韋佩文 ... [等」(2004). 從一九二八年說起 : 香港廣播七十五年專輯. 香港: 香港電台.
 Pinyin translated by Cozy Website.

Notes

External links
 881903.com Commercial Radio

Radio stations in Hong Kong
Multilingual broadcasters
Cantonese-language radio stations
Radio stations established in 1959